Psychomotor therapy is a pedagogic and therapeutic approach, the aim of which is to support and aid an individual’s personal development. It is based on a holistic view of human beings that considers each individual as a unity of physical, emotional and cognitive actualities, which interact with each other and the surrounding social environment.

Psychomotor specialists study the body and its expressivity. The body is regarded not merely as a mechanism with neurophysiological developments, but also as a thing with deep-rooted emotional traits, which have come about through somato-psychic experiences, particularly in early-childhood. Psychomotor specialists work in the field of prevention, education, re-education, rehabilitation, and research. Psychomotor education and therapy can be used for any age group.

A school of psychomotor education, called the Aucouturier Psychomotor Practice, was developed by French pedagogists Bernard Aucouturier and Andre Lapierre.

References

Motor control
Pedagogy